The Jupiter radius or Jovian radius ( or )  has a value of , or 11.2 Earth radii (one Earth radius equals ). The Jupiter radius is a unit of length used in astronomy to describe the radii of gas giants and some extrasolar planets. It is also used in describing brown dwarfs.

This constant is defined as exactly:
 = 
Similarly, the nominal polar Jovian radius is defined to be exactly:
 = 
These values correspond to the radius of Jupiter at 1 bar of pressure. The common usage is to refer to the equatorial radius, unless the polar radius is specifically needed.

Comparison 

For comparison, one Solar radius is equivalent to:
 400 Lunar radius()
 109 Earth radius
 9.735 Jupiter radius

References 

Planetary science
Units of measurement in astronomy
Radius